Víctor Hugo Lojero (born 17 November 1984) is a Mexican professional footballer. He currently plays for Venados as a forward. Lojero made his professional debut with San Luis in 2005.

Lojero played professionally for San Luis and Necaxa.

Honours

Club
Chapulineros de Oaxaca
 Liga de Balompié Mexicano: 2020–21, 2021

Individual
 Liga de Balompié Mexicano top scorer: 2021

References

External links

1984 births
Living people
Footballers from Mexico City
Club América footballers
San Luis F.C. players
Club Necaxa footballers
Mexican people of Swedish descent
Mexican footballers
Association football forwards
Liga MX players
Ascenso MX players
Liga de Balompié Mexicano players